Crosby ( – Cross farm or cross roads, market place) is a small village located  west of Douglas in the parish of Marown in the Isle of Man.

Description
The village of Crosby is situated in the center of the parish of Marown on the primary A1 Douglas to Peel at the cross-road junction with the A23 Mount Rule Road and the B35 Garth Road.

It has a population of about 900. The River Dhoo flows to the south of Crosby village through the main Douglas to Peel Central valley.

Village

The old St Runius church, which was the original Marown parish church until the new church was built in 1859, is located in Crosby. Part of the old church dates back to the 12th century. It was expanded in 1754. When the new church was built, the original church was used as a mortuary chapel and part of the east side was demolished. The building was eventually restored and re-opened on 9 August 1959, with services now held regularly each summer and or major festivals. The village also has a Methodist chapel. Crosby Wesleyan Methodist Chapel was opened on 6 October 1833.

Marown Language Centre, a foreign language teaching facility and training centre for teachers on the island is located in Crosby, close to the old St Runius Church.

The village's historic railway station opened on 1 July 1873 and last operated on 7 September 1968 when the line closed. It was on the Douglas to Peel line of the Isle of Man Railway which now forms the Heritage Trail, following the course of the old line. The station was demolished but the crossing keeper's cottage on the east side is now a shelter for walkers on the trail.

Local amenities in Crosby include a children's play park, football and cricket pitch, chapel and pub, which is also a popular spectator spot for watching the Isle of Man TT.

Sport
Marown F.C. is a football club which competes in the Isle of Man Football League playing home games at the Memorial Playing Fields in Crosby. The village also has the Crosby Cricket Club which shares the same site. Founded in 1946, the club is part of the Isle of Man Cricket Association.

Motor-Sport heritage
The Crosby village section of the A1 Douglas to Peel road  was part of the short Highland Course from 1906 and the also the  Four Inch Course used for car racing including the  RAC Tourist Trophy car races held between 1906 and 1922. 

In 1911, the Four Inch Course  was first used by the Auto-Cycling Union for the Isle of Man TT motorcycle races.  This included the Crosby cross-roads and Crosby village sections and the course later became known as the  Isle of Man TT Mountain Course which has been used since 1911 for the Isle of Man TT Races  and from 1923 for the Manx Grand Prix races.

Gallery

References

Villages in the Isle of Man
Crosby Crossroads